David Szurman (born 24 March 1981 in Třinec) is a Czech former ice dancer. With his skating partner, Kateřina Kovalová, he is the 1999 Ondrej Nepela Memorial silver medalist, the 1999 Karl Schäfer Memorial bronze medalist, the 2000 Golden Spin of Zagreb bronze medalist, and a two-time national champion (2000, 2001). They competed in the final segment at three ISU Championships – the 2000 European Championships in Vienna, Austria; 2001 European Championships in Bratislava, Slovakia; and 2001 World Championships in Vancouver, British Columbia, Canada. In February 2002, they represented the Czech Republic at the 2002 Winter Olympics in Salt Lake City, placing 20th.

Kovalová/Szurman were coached by František Blaťák in Ostrava. Before his partnership with Kovalová, Szurman competed with Monika Kramná.

Programs 
(with Kovalová)

Results
GP: Grand Prix; JGP: Junior Series (Junior Grand Prix)

(with Kovalová)

References

References

External links
 IceDance.com profile

Czech male ice dancers
Olympic figure skaters of the Czech Republic
Figure skaters at the 2002 Winter Olympics
1981 births
Sportspeople from Třinec
Living people